Iagitlim was king of Mari, Syria during the 19th century BC. He was probably of Amorite origin. Little is known about his reign except that he came into conflict with his neighbour Ila-kabkabu of Terqa after the two had first been allies. Iagitlim was succeeded by his son Iakhdunlim.

Amorite kings
Kings of Mari
19th-century BC rulers
19th-century BC people